The United States House Committee on House Administration deals with the general administration matters of the United States House of Representatives.

History
The Committee on House Administration was created by the Legislative Reorganization Act of 1946, which merged the Committees on Enrolled Bills (created in 1789 as Joint Committee), Elections (created in 1794), Accounts (created in 1803), Printing (created in 1846), Disposition of Executive Papers (created in 1889), Memorials (created in 1929), and some functions of the Joint Committee on the Library (created in 1806 as a Joint Committee) into one new standing committee, the Committee on House Administration.  (See National Archives's Records of the House Administration Committee and Its Predecessors)

In 1975 its responsibilities expanded to include oversight of parking facilities and campaign contributions to House candidates. In 1979, as part of the annual appropriations bill for the legislative branch, this committee absorbed the responsibilities of the former Select Committee on the Beauty Shop, which had been chaired by Rep. Yvonne Brathwaite Burke and was responsible for overseeing the operations of a beauty shop for House members, employees, and their families.

In 1995 its responsibilities expanded to include oversight of the Commission on Congressional Mailing Standards.

Jurisdiction

The Committee on House Administration is a standing committee of the United States House of Representatives. The powers and duties of the Committee include the statutory responsibilities of the Committee on House Administration, as determined primarily by the Legislative Reorganization Acts of 1946 and 1970; the House of Representatives Administrative Reform Technical Corrections Act of 1996; and the Rules of the House of Representatives adopted on January 6, 1999.

The Committee on House Administration, which consists of nine members, has jurisdiction over all legislation and other matters relating to the House of Representatives, such as:
 Appropriations from accounts (and the expenditure, auditing and settling thereof) for committee salaries and expenses, except for the Committee on Appropriations; House Information Resources; and allowances and expenses of Members, Delegates, the Resident Commissioner, Officers, and administrative offices of the House.
 Employment of persons by the House, including staff for Members, Delegates, the Resident Commissioner, and Committees; and reporters of debates.
 The Library of Congress, including management thereof.
 The House Library.
 Statuary and pictures.
 Acceptance or purchase of works of art for the Capitol.
 United States Botanic Garden.
 Purchase of books and manuscripts.
 The Smithsonian Institution and the incorporation of similar institutions .
 The Commission on Congressional Mailing Standards (Franking Commission).
 Printing and correction of the Congressional Record.
 Accounts of the House generally.
 Assignment of office space for Members, Delegates, the Resident Commissioner, and Committees.
 Disposition of useless executive papers.
 Election of the President, Vice President, Members, Senators, Delegates, or the Resident Commissioner; corrupt practices; contested elections; credentials and qualifications; and Federal elections generally.
 Services to the House, including House food services, parking facilities, and administration of the House Office Buildings and of the House wing of the Capitol.
 Travel of Members, Delegates, and the Resident Commissioner.
 Raising, reporting, and use of campaign contributions for candidates for office of Representative, of Delegate, and of Resident Commissioner.
 Compensation, retirement, and other benefits of the Members, Delegates, the Resident Commissioner, Officers, and employees of Congress.

Additionally, the Committee:
 Provides policy direction for the Inspector General and oversight of the Clerk, Sergeant at Arms, Chief Administrative Officer, and Inspector General.
 Has the function of accepting on behalf of the House of Representatives a gift, except as otherwise provided by law, if the gift does not involve a duty, burden, or condition, or is not made dependent on some future performance by the House; and promulgating regulations under which to do so.
 Is responsible for considering amounts of payments of funds resulting from settlements of complaints under the Congressional Accountability Act of 1995.
 Membership on the Joint Committee on Printing and the Joint Committee on the Library are drawn from House Administration along with Members from the Senate Committee on Rules and Administration.  The Chairman of the Appropriation Committee's Legislative Branch Subcommittee is also a member of the Joint Committee on the Library.

Members, 118th Congress

Resolutions electing members:  (R),  (D)

Subcommittees
Due to its relatively small size, the House Administration Committee has not had subcommittees for most of its existence. For the 110th Congress, Chairwoman Millinder-McDonald recommended the creation of two new subcommittees, on Elections and Oversight, which were approved by the full committee on February 16, 2007. However, in the 113th Congress, the committee abolished both subcommittees. The Elections Subcommittee was reconstituted for the 116th Congress.

For the 118th Congress:

Committee chairs

Historical membership rosters

117th Congress

Resolutions electing members:  (Chair),  (Ranking Member),  (D),  (R)

Subcommittees

116th Congress

Sources:  (Chair),  (Ranking Member),  (D),  (R)

Subcommittees

Commission on Congressional Mailing Standards (Franking Commission)

115th Congress

See also
 List of current United States House of Representatives committees

References

External links

 Committee on House Administration homepage (Archive)
 House Administration Committee. Legislation activity and reports, Congress.gov.
 House Administration Committee Hearings and Meetings Video. Congress.gov.
 Members' Congressional Handbook
 A History of the Committee on House Administration, 1947-2012.

House Administration
1946 establishments in Washington, D.C.
Government agencies established in 1946